Lucknow North is a constituency of the Uttar Pradesh Legislative Assembly covering the city of Northern part of Lucknow in the Lucknow district of Uttar Pradesh, India.VVPAT facility with EVMs was here in 2017 U.P assembly polls.

Lucknow North is one of five assembly constituencies in the Lucknow Lok Sabha constituency. Since 2008, this assembly constituency is numbered 172 amongst 403 constituencies.

Currently this seat belongs to Bharatiya Janata Party candidate Neeraj Bora who won in last Assembly election of 2022 Uttar Pradesh Legislative Elections defeating Samajwadi Party candidate Pooja Shukla by a margin of 33,953 votes.

Members of the Legislative Assembly

Election results

2022

2017

2012

References

Assembly constituencies of Uttar Pradesh